Dobrinsky (masculine), Dobrinskaya (feminine), or Dobrinskoye (neuter) may refer to:
Dobrinsky District, a district of Lipetsk Oblast, Russia
Cynthia Dobrinski (b. 1950), composer and arranger of handbell music